Sut Saneha is a 2009 Thai lakorn (telenovela), based on best selling novel by famous author King Chat, starring Theeradej Wongpuapan, Ann Thongprasom, Willy McIntosh and Sonia Couling that originally aired on Channel 3 (Thailand).

Plot
The story revolves around Alin (Ann Thongprasom), a 30-year-old Nang Ek (นางเอก: soap opera star) with an over-inflated sense of her own celebrity. Aware that her career is on the wane because of her age and much younger competition, Alin is looking to marry the "right" man; handsome, rich, famous, with a prestigious name and a mansion to match. When she is contacted by television producer Khun Lek Anucha (Willy McIntosh) to audition as a celebrity chef for his new TV cooking show, Alin quickly accepts but lies about her lack of cooking skills. She immediately falls in love with Khun Lek the first time they meet and hatches a plan to marry him.

While Alin's reputation is that of a typical prim and proper actress, in reality she is stubborn, spoiled, conceited, and childlike. Desperate to land the cooking show job, Alin hires the earnest apprentice chef Din/Pasu (Theeradeth Wonpuapan) to quickly teach her how to cook. The two opposite personalities immediately clash but soon come to appreciate one another. Through the course of the story, Alin  develops feelings for Din while questioning her desire to marry the "perfect man" Khun Lek.

Cast
 Ken Theeradeth Wongpuapan as Phasu "Din" Boriban / Kru Cook - working as a cooking teacher in a university and a chef in an Italian restaurant, he later becomes the cooking teacher of Alin, though every time they encounter each other it always end up in arguments but later Din or Kru Cook (the nickname given to him by Alin) falls for Alin's outgoing personality. It is also shown that he is the son of a very wealthy man and the maid of the household they are currently living in. Because of this he is often bullied or looked down upon by his stepbrother Lom and stepsister Nam.

It is also later revealed that he is the former co-worker of Sophita and harbors romantic feelings for her but on the day he will propose to her, Sophita introduces Anucha to her boyfriend, later the father of her child.
 Ann Thongprasom as Alin "Lin" Thipphayada - a 30-year-old famous Nang'Ek whose popularity has gone away because of her age and much younger competition. She is currently looking for her "Mr. Right", a man who is rich, famous, and has a prestigious background. Having no jobs for a while, she is later contacted by Praew, the secretary of Anucha, to host a cooking show. She quickly accepts, and there she meets Din Pasu whom she nicknames as "Kru Cook". Though they often argue about things Alin quickly becomes attached to Kru Cook, later realizing that she loves "Kru Cook".

Alin is also known for her different personalities she inherited from her late aunties, which is described by Smally as why Alin is very different from any other people. By the end of the series she and Din marry.

 Willy McIntosh as Anucha "Lek" Sophat - a wealthy man and the father of Sophita's daughter. He is Alin's "Mr. Right" though he doesn't really take Alin seriously at first because of his love and obligation with Sophita and his daughter, but later tries to pursue Alin for his mother's satisfaction, but later realizes that he loves Sophita. By the end of the series he remarries Sophita while not listening to his mother's advice like he did before.
Sonia Couling as Sophita "Ta" Jarukorn - Din's former co-worker and love interest and Anucha's former wife after being kicked out by Anucha's mother. After marrying Anucha they have a daughter named Pupey who has a health problem. She later suffers after Anucha's evil mother kicked her out of their household, which almost gave her a miscarriage and is currently ruining her life after finding out that she is getting some support from Anucha. At the end of the series she and Anucha remarry and live a happy life.

Supporting cast
 Nithi Samutkhochon as Khom-Patikhom "Smally" - Alin and Din's friend and Alin's manager. He is shown to be one of the people who always helps Alin when Alin creates trouble or in a showbiz issue and the one that helps Alin find her cooking teacher.
 Nithichai Yotamonsunthon as Wayu "Lom" Boriban - Din's stepbrother and Nam's biological brother and also the boyfriend of Ming. He is an ambitious person who always looks down on the people below him, including Din. After knowing that Din is connected to the famous Alin, he tries to pursue Alin but fails due to Alin protecting Din from his evil stepbrother. This leads to Ming and Alin's brawl in the market and later reveals his plan to Ming to ruin Din's life. He is one of the antagonists in the story.
 Panwat Memani as Ming Durarat Utsanee - the girlfriend of Lom and once a well-known actress just like Alin, but after Alin ruins her image at the red carpet her career ended which led her to the point where she will want to get her revenge on Alin by also ruining her career but after many attempts she always fail. She is one of the antagonists of the story.
 Daran Bunyasak as Warin "Nam" Boriban- Lom's biological sister and Din's stepsister. Just like Lom she is an ambitious person who thinks too highly of herself knowing that she is the daughter of a very wealthy man and looks down on Din since Din's mother is just the maid of the household. She is one of the antagonists in the story.
Phenphak Sirikun as Napha "Fa" Boriban
 Kriangkrai Unhanan as Kru Anun - Alin's father who is also wealthy since he owns a very big farm in the country.
Duangchai Hathaikan as Nongphanga
Duangta Tungkhamani as Amara Sophat
Chomphu Konbai as On
Pachari Na Nakhon as Phiao
Phanthila Fuklin as Hyong Guen - a Thai/Korean rising actress who takes an interest to Din that lead to Alin's jealousy and leading her to say that Din is gay to Hyong Guen. She later plays the daughter Alin in one of Alin's recent lakorn (drama). She loves the impression of "Sarang haeyo" ("I love you" in Korean) and kimchi (a well-known food in Korea or expression).

Guests
 Nathawan Saksirik as Tongta "Tong" (episodes 6 & 13) - the girl who is chosen by Din to be one of Alin's guests on her TV show. Known to be a straightforward type of person at her age, Alin doesn't get along with her but ends up blackmailing her, which leads to the success of her own show.

Actors 2009

Quote 
If you fall in love with someone because he's perfect.. Then one day when you find a flaw in him, you will easily fall out of love for him. But if you fall in love with someone because you love him for him. He will become perfect in your eyes...and you will love him..no matter what happens.

Awards

International broadcast
 This lakorn aired in Vietnam on July 13, 2015 on TodayTV VTC7, under the title Công thức tình yêu.

References

External links 

 Sut Saneha Official Site (in Thai)
Sut Saneha Synopsis (in English)

Thai television soap operas
2000s Thai television series
2008 Thai television series debuts
2008 Thai television series endings
Channel 3 (Thailand) original programming